Ameterkmakhi (Dargwa: Аметеркмахьи) is a rural locality (a selo) in Akushinsky District, Republic of Dagestan, Russia. The population was 2,140 as of 2010. There are 7 streets.

Geography 
Ameterkmakhi is located on the Akusha River, 16 km northwest of Akusha (the district's administrative centre) by road. Kurkabi is the nearest rural locality.

References 

Rural localities in Akushinsky District